Ajay Wadhavkar was a Hindi and Marathi film and television actor.

Career
Wadhavkar's notable TV serial roles include the one of the bumbling cop Ganpat Hawaldar, from the yesteryear milestone TV serial Nukkad in 1986, directed by Kundan Shah and Saeed Akhtar Mirza, and in the TV serial Pavitra Rishta, where he played Sushant Singh Rajput (Manav)s' father. He was also a part of movies like Yes Boss (1997) and English Babu Desi Mem (1996).

Filmography

Television

 1986–1987 Nukkad (TV Series) – Ganpat Hawaldaar
 1989 Circus (TV series)
 1993 Byomkesh Bakshi (TV Series) (Episode: Chiriya Ghar (Part 1 & 2)) as Dr. Nagendra Pal (credited as Ajay Vadhavkar)

Films

 1983 Jaane Bhi Do Yaaro (as Ajay Vadhaokar)
 1984 Mohan Joshi Hazir Ho! – Court Messenger
 1987 Gammat Jammat-Ruffian/Goon Marathi Film
 1988 Shahenshah – Shalu's friend (as Ajay Wadhavarkar)
 1988 Ek Gadi Baaki Anadi Marathi Film
 1989 Bhrashtachar – Havaldar Victory Ganesh (as Ajay Vadhwakar)
 1989 ChaalBaaz- Bank Manager (Uncredited)
 1989 Pheka Pheki – Bagaram Marathi Film
 1989 Hamaal De Dhamaal – Ganpat Hawaldar Marathi Film
 1991 Akayla-as Traffic Police Constable (Cameo Role) in the song "Chal Chal Re Chal Meri Ram Piyaari"
 1991 Ek Full Chaar Half  Marathi Film
 1992 Jeeva Sakha – Pandit Marathi Film
 1996 English Babu Desi Mem - Ajay Vadhawkar
 1997 Prithvi 
 1997 Yes Boss
 2000 Phir Bhi Dil Hai Hindustani
 2000 Le Chal Apne Sang - Ajay Wadhawakar
 2003 Fun2shh... Dudes in the 10th Century – Constable Sakharam
 2010 Asa Mi Tasa Mi- Police Constable Palav

Death
Ajay was diagnosed with diabetes as well as throat cancer and was under going treatment at Nanavati hospital in Mumbai, Maharashtra, India. The actor was also facing a financial crisis and Bollywood's popular comic actor Johnny Lever lent him a helping hand. He died on 27 February 2015 in his hometown in Pune, Maharashtra, India.

References

External links
 

2015 deaths
Male actors from Mumbai
Indian male film actors
Male actors in Hindi cinema
Male actors in Marathi cinema
20th-century Indian male actors
21st-century Indian male actors
Male actors in Hindi television
1955 births